Check Oumar Diakité (born 5 December 2002) is a French professional footballer who plays as a midfielder for  club Le Havre  on loan from Paris FC.

Early life 
Born in Montreuil, Seine-Saint-Denis, Diakité went to several Francilian clubs, such as Choisy-le-Roi, Créteil and Montrouge FC92, before joining Paris FC in the summer of 2019.

Club career 
Diakité made his professional debut for Paris FC on the 21 November 2020, coming on as a half-time substitute against AJ Auxerre, as Paris FC, the then leaders of Ligue 2, where already down 3–0, eventually losing the game with that score.

He got his first debut a few weeks later against Clermont Foot, then ending the year with another debut in the 3–2 win against USL Dunkerque on the 22 December 2020.

Personal life
Born in France, Diakité is of Malian descent.

References

External links
 

2002 births
Sportspeople from Montreuil, Seine-Saint-Denis
Footballers from Seine-Saint-Denis
French people of Malian descent
Living people
French footballers
France youth international footballers
Association football midfielders
AS Choisy-le-Roi players
Paris FC players
Le Havre AC players
Ligue 2 players
Championnat National 3 players